Potthastia pastoris is a non-biting midge species in the genus Potthastia.

References

External links

Chironomidae
Diptera of Europe
Insects described in 1933